Metasia perirrorata is a moth in the family Crambidae. It was described by George Hampson in 1913. It is found in the Democratic Republic of the Congo (Kasai-Occidental) and Nigeria.

References

Moths described in 1913
Metasia